The Security Fundamentals Professional Certification (SFPC) is a credential offered to Americans under the Security Professional Education Development Program (SPēD).   

The SFPC is sponsored through the Center for Development of Security Excellence (CDSE), a part of the Defense Security Service (DSS) in the US Government.

Description
The intent of the SFPC is to provide a recognized and reliable indication of a security practitioner's understanding of foundational concepts, principles, and practices needed to successfully perform functions, implement programs, and pursue missions to protect Department of Defense (DoD) assets.

The SFPC is the initial certification level in the SPēD program and was NCCA accredited in December 2012. Additional SPēD certifications, such as the Security Asset Protection Professional Certification (SAPPC) and Security Program Integration Professional (SPIPC), may only be attained following the initial conferral of the SFPC.

SFPC certification eligibility is restricted to--
 Department of Defense (DoD) personnel assigned to a security position
 DoD personnel who volunteer for SPēD Certification testing
 DoD contractor personnel performing security duties directly for a DoD Component
 Industry security professionals and practitioners performing duties under the National Industrial Security Program

References

Professional titles and certifications
Security